Gloria Marinelli (born 12 March 1998) is an Italian professional footballer who plays as a forward for Serie A club Inter Milan and the Italy women's national team.

International career
Marinelli made her debut for the Italy national team on 4 October 2019 against Malta.

Personal life
Marinelli's mother is called Giovanna and her father, Mauro, is a former footballer.

References

1998 births
Living people
Women's association football forwards
Italian women's footballers
Italy women's international footballers
Sportspeople from the Province of Isernia
Footballers from Molise
Inter Milan (women) players
Serie A (women's football) players
ASD Femminile Inter Milano players
21st-century Italian women